The inferior alveolar nerve (IAN) (also the inferior dental nerve) is a branch of the mandibular nerve, which is itself the third branch of the trigeminal nerve. The inferior alveolar nerves supply sensation to the lower teeth.

Structure 
The inferior alveolar nerve is a branch of the mandibular nerve. After branching from the mandibular nerve, the inferior alveolar nerve travels behind the lateral pterygoid muscle. It gives off a branch, the mylohyoid nerve, and then enters the mandibular foramen.

While in the mandibular canal within the mandible, it supplies the lower teeth (molars and second premolar) with sensory branches that form into the inferior dental plexus and give off small gingival and dental nerves to the teeth.

Anteriorly, the nerve gives off the mental nerve at about the level of the mandibular 2nd premolars, which exits the mandible via the mental foramen and supplies sensory branches to the chin and lower lip.

The inferior alveolar nerve continues anteriorly as the mandibular incisive nerve to innervate the mandibular canines and incisors.

Variation 
Rarely, a bifid inferior alveolar nerve may be present, in which case a second mandibular foramen, more inferiorly placed, exists and can be detected by noting a doubled mandibular canal on a radiograph.

Function 
The Inferior Alveolar nerves supply sensation to the lower teeth, and, via the mental nerve, sensation to the chin and lower lip.

The mylohyoid nerve is a motor nerve supplying the mylohyoid and the anterior belly of the digastric.

Clinical significance

Injury
Inferior nerve injury most commonly occurs during surgery including wisdom tooth, dental implant placement in the mandible, root canal treatment where tooth roots are close to the nerve canal in the mandible, deep dental local anaesthetic injections or orthognathic surgery. Trauma and related mandibular fractures are also often related to inferior alveolar nerve injuries.

Trigeminal sensory nerve injuries are associated with numbness, pain, altered sensation and usually a combination of all three. This can result in a significant reduction in quality of life with functional difficulties and psychological impact<.

The risk associated with wisdom tooth surgery is commonly accepted to be 2% temporary and 0.2% permanent. However, this risk assessment is not concrete as the same source is cited for lingual nerve paresthesia.  It is well documented that inferior alveolar nerve injury is more common than lingual nerve injury.  The percentage of injury varies significantly in different studies. Furthermore, many factors affect the incidence of nerve injury.  For example, the incidence of nerve injury in teens removing third molars is much lower than the incidence in patients 25 and older. This risk increases 10 fold if the tooth is close to the inferior dental canal containing the inferior alveolar nerve (as judged on a dental radiograph). These high risk wisdom teeth can be further assessed using cone beam CT imaging to assess and plan surgery to minimise nerve injury by careful extraction or undertaking a coronectomy procedure in healthy patients with healthy teeth. 
 
The risk of nerve injury in relation to mandibular dental implants is not known but it is a recognised risk requiring the patient to be warned. If an injury occurs urgent treatment is required. The risk nerve injury in relation deep dental injections has a risk of injury in approximately 1:14,000 with 25% of these remaining persistent. Routine preoperative warnings about these injuries should occur before surgery, and represent good practice. Inferior alveolar nerve injury secondary to orthodontic treatment is also emerging in the literature in the recent years as a rare complication and manifested as anesthesia, parenthesis, or combination of both; however full recovery was achieved in all of the reported cases when proper management was applied.

Anesthesia

During dental procedures, a local nerve block may be applied. Anaesthetic injected near the mandibular foramen to block the inferior alveolar nerve and the nearby lingual nerve (supplying the tongue).  This causes loss of sensation on the same side as the block to:
 the teeth (inferior alveolar nerve block)
 the lower lip and chin (mental nerve block)
 front two-thirds of the tongue (lingual nerve block).

Studies found that oral medications of NSAIDs taken before the dental procedure increases the efficacy of the anesthesia in patients with irreversible pulpitis.

See also 
 Alveolar nerve (Dental nerve)
 Superior alveolar nerve (Superior dental nerve)
 Anterior superior alveolar nerve (Anterior superior dental nerve)
 Middle superior alveolar nerve (Middle superior dental nerve)
 Posterior superior alveolar nerve (Posterior superior dental nerve)

Additional images

References

External links 
 
 
 
 

Mandibular nerve
Mouth